Tracie Davis (born May 6, 1970, in Jacksonville, Florida) is an American politician and former teacher who currently serves as the Senator for District 5 in the Florida Senate as a member of the Democratic Party. After former Democratic representative Reggie Fullwood pleaded guilty to two counts of federal fraud, Davis was selected by the Duval County Democratic Party to replace him on the ticket for District 13 in the Florida House of Representatives.

Prior to her run, she was a special education teacher for Duval County Public Schools, and subsequently worked as the deputy supervisor of elections. She holds education degrees from University of North Florida and Edward Waters College.

References

Democratic Party members of the Florida House of Representatives
Living people
People from Jacksonville, Florida
University of North Florida alumni
Edward Waters College alumni
1970 births
Women state legislators in Florida
21st-century American politicians
21st-century American women politicians
21st-century African-American politicians
21st-century African-American women
African-American state legislators in Florida
African-American women in politics